Carl-Jan Hamilton (3 July 1916 – 24 June 2007) was a Swedish equestrian. He competed in two events at the 1952 Summer Olympics.

References

1916 births
2007 deaths
Swedish male equestrians
Olympic equestrians of Sweden
Equestrians at the 1952 Summer Olympics
Sportspeople from Stockholm